Wrenthorpe and Outwood West is a former ward in the metropolitan borough of the City of Wakefield, West Yorkshire, England.  It contains five listed buildings that are recorded in the National Heritage List for England. All the listed buildings are designated at Grade II, the lowest of the three grades, which is applied to "buildings of national importance and special interest".  The former ward includes the village of Wrenthorpe, parts of  Outwood, and Alverthorpe, and the surrounding area.  The listed buildings consist of houses, and house and school, and a church.


Buildings

References

Citations

Sources

 

Lists of listed buildings in West Yorkshire